Bangalore Mirror is a daily English-language newspaper published in Bangalore, India. It is a deputed newspaper and is the second-largest circulating English newspaper in the city

Vijay Times
Vijay Times was an English newspaper started by Vijayananda printers in December 2002. The newspaper along with other sister publications was bought by the Bennett, Coleman & Co. Ltd. in 2006, publishers of India's leading newspaper, The Times of India. It ceased publication on 7 June 2007, and was replaced by the Bangalore Mirror.

References

External links
 Bangalore Mirror

English-language newspapers published in India
Publications of The Times Group
2003 establishments in Karnataka
2007 disestablishments in India
Defunct newspapers published in India
Publications established in 2003
Publications disestablished in 2007
Bangalore
2006 mergers and acquisitions